Hippia may refer to:
 Hippia (plant), a genus of flowering plant in the sunflower family
 Hippia (moth), a genus of moth of the family Notodontidae
 Hippia, an epithet of the Greek goddess Athena
 Hippia, alternate name of Phalanna, an ancient city of Thessaly

See also 
 Hippias (disambiguation)